Friedrich Emil Rittershaus (3 April 1834 – 8 March 1897) was a German poet.

Biography
He was born in Barmen (now Wuppertal), Germany. His poetry, marked by simple feeling, fine diction, and original matter, won great popularity.  He died in Barmen. His daughter, Adeline, was a philologist, scholar, and champion for the equality of women.

Works
The best known of his works are:
  Gedichte (Poems; 1856; 8th ed. 1891)
 Am Rhein und beim Wein (By the Rhine and with wine; 1884; 3d ed. 1893)
 Buch der Leidenschaft (Book of passion; 1886)
 In Bruderliebe und Brudertreue (In brotherly love and brotherly fidelity; 1893)
 Westfalenlied (Westfalia Anthem; 1886)
 Spruchperlen heitrer lebenskunst  (Proverbs of cheerful life; 1893)

Notes

References

External links
 

1834 births
1897 deaths
German poets
German male poets
19th-century poets
19th-century German writers
19th-century German male writers